The women's high jump event  at the 1987 IAAF World Indoor Championships was held at the Hoosier Dome in Indianapolis on 8 March. There was no qualification round, only a final round.

Results

References

High jump
High jump at the World Athletics Indoor Championships